Takeshi Yoshida is chief engineer for the 2000 Toyota Corolla and a Senior Managing Director of Toyota Motor Corporation. In 2003, Yoshida was appointed as Managing Officer of the Lexus Development Center, to spearhead the luxury division's development of new platforms and technologies.  In 2007, Yoshidaa was promoted from his Managing Officer position to Senior Managing Director on the Toyota board.

References

 Fast Company
 Toyota Company Profile

Year of birth missing (living people)
Japanese engineers
Living people